Scymnus notescens, the Minute Two Spotted Ladybird Beetle, is a species of beetle found in the family Coccinellidae discovered by Thomas Blackburn in 1889. It is found in Australia.

References 

Coccinellidae
Beetles of Australia